The Centre de services scolaire de la Pointe-de-l'Île (CSSPÎ) is an autonomous school service centre in Montreal, Quebec, Canada, based primarily in the city's east end, appointed by the Ministry of Education.

It serves French public schools in the Montreal boroughs of  Montréal-Nord, Saint-Léonard, Anjou, and Rivière-des-Prairies–Pointe-aux-Trembles. It also serves Montréal-Est, a municipality outside of the Montreal city limits. Its headquarters is in the Pointe-aux-Trembles area of Montreal.

On June 15, 2020, it replaced the former elected Commission scolaire de la Pointe-de-l'Île (Pointe-de-l'Île school commission or school board).

Schools

Secondary schools

 École secondaire d'Anjou (Anjou)
 École secondaire Antoine-de-St-Exupéry (St. Leonard)
 École secondaire Calixa-Lavallée (Montreal North)
 École secondaire Daniel-Johnson (Pointe-aux-Trembles)
 École secondaire Guy-Vanier
 École secondaire Henri-Bourassa (Montreal North)
 École secondaire Jean-Grou (Rivière-des-Prairies)
 École secondaire La Passerelle
 École secondaire La Relance / Centre Ferland
 École secondaire Le Tournesol
 École secondaire Pointe-aux-Trembles (Pointe-aux-Trembles)

Primary schools

Adélard-Desrosiers (Montreal North)
Albatros
Alphonse-Pesant (St. Leonard)
Cardinal-Léger (Anjou)
Chénier (Anjou)
De la Fraternité (Montreal North)
Denise-Pelletier (Rivière-des-Prairies) 
Des Roseraies (Anjou)
Félix-Leclerc (Pointe-aux-Trembles)
Fernand-Gauthier (Rivière-des-Prairies)
François-La Bernarde (Pointe-aux-Trembles)
Gabrielle-Roy (St. Leonard)
Jacques-Rousseau (Anjou)
Jean-Nicolet and Jean-Nicolet Annexe (Montreal North)
Jules-Verne (Montreal North)
La Dauversière (St. Leonard)
Lambert-Closse
Le Carignan (Montreal North)
Le Tournesol (Pointe-aux-Trembles)
Marc-Aurèle-Fortin and Marc-Aurèle-Fortin annexe (Rivière-des-Prairies)
Montmartre (Pointe-aux-Trembles)
Notre-Dame (Pointe-aux-Trembles)
Notre-Dame-de-Fatima (Rivière-des-Prairies)
Pie XII (St. Leonard)
Pierre-de-Coubertin (Montreal North)
René-Guénette (Montreal North)
Belle-rive pavillon de la pointe 
Saint-Joseph (Anjou)
Saint-Marcel (Pointe-aux-Trembles)
Saint-Octave (Montreal East)
Saint-Rémi and Saint-Rémi Annexe (Montreal North)
Saint-Vincent-Marie (Montreal North)
Sainte-Colette and Sainte-Colette Annexe (Montreal North)
Sainte-Germaine-Cousin (Pointe-aux-Trembles)
Sainte-Gertrude (Montreal North)
Sainte-Marguerite-Bourgeoys (Pointe-aux-Trembles)
Belle-rive pavillon des trembles (Pointe-aux-Trembles)
Simone-Desjardins Pavillon Gouin (Rivière-des-Prairies)
Simone-Desjardins Pavillon Perras
Victor-Lavigne (St. Leonard)
Wilfrid-Bastien (St. Leonard)
Wilfrid-Pelletier (Anjou)

Other schools
Specialized schools:
Guy-Vanier
La Passerelle
Le Tournesol
Marc-Laflamme/Le Prélude

Adult schools:
Centre Amos
Centre Anjou
Centre Antoine-de-St-Exupéry
Centre Eusèbe-Gagnon
Centre Ferland
Centre Louis-Fréchette
Centre Louis-Fréchette Annexe
Centre Paul-Gratton

Professional development centres:
Centre Anjou
Centre Antoine-de-St-Exupéry
Centre Calixa-Lavallée
Centre Daniel-Johnson
Centre de formation des métiers de l'acier
École Hôtelière de Montréal Calixa-Lavallée

Districts 
1 Pointe-aux-Trembles / Montréal-Est, Quebec
2 Anjou, Quebec

3 Saint-Leonard, Quebec

4 Montréal-Nord

5 Rivière-des-Prairies, Quebec

References

External links

Centre de services scolaire de la Pointe-de-l'Île 

School districts in Quebec
Education in Montreal